Let the Power Fall is the second studio album by Max Romeo, released in 1971. The album, in contrast to Romeo's debut A Dream, included politically charged material. It was engineered by Carlton Lee and Sid Bucknor.

Track listing
All tracks composed by Max Romeo; except where noted.
Side A
"Let the Power Fall"
"Bachelor Boy" (The Shadows)
"Cracklin' Rosie" (Neil Diamond)
"Chatter Box" (Bob Marley)
"Missing You" (Adapted)
Side B
"Puppet on a String" (Adapted)
"My Special Prayer" (Joe Simon)
"Fowl Thief" (Max Romeo, Lloyd Clarke)
"Hola Zion"
"Macabee Version"
Bonus tracks
"Before the Next Tear Drop Falls"
"On the Beach"
"Nice Time"
"Thank You Lord"
"Nothing Takes the Place of You"

Singles
1971: "Let the Power Fall"
1971: "Macabee Version"

References

1971 albums
Max Romeo albums